The following words are terms used in sumo wrestling in Japan.

A

B

C

D

E

F

G

H

I

J

K

M

N

O

R

S

T

W

Y

Z

References

External links

 Glossary of Sumo Terms
 Sumo Glossary
 Sumopedia at NHK World-Japan

Sumo
Sumo-related lists
 
Wikipedia glossaries using description lists